Johan Langell (born 16 May 1975) is a Swedish musician. He is best known as the former drummer of the Swedish progressive rock band Pain of Salvation.

Discography

Pain of Salvation
Hereafter (1996) (demo)
Entropia (1997)
One Hour by the Concrete Lake (1998)
Ashes (2000) (single)The Perfect Element, part I (2000)Remedy Lane (2002)12:5 (2004) (live)BE (2004)BE (Original Stage Production) (2005) (live)Scarsick'' (2007)

References 

1975 births
Living people
Swedish heavy metal drummers
Pain of Salvation members
21st-century drummers

pl:Johan Langell